The Limnoriidea are a suborder of marine isopod crustaceans.

Families

The suborder contains three families in a single superfamily:

Superfamily Limnorioidea 
Family Hadromastacidae 
Family Keuphyliidae 
Family Limnoriidae

References

Isopoda
Arthropod suborders